This is a list of the National Register of Historic Places listings in Hunt County, Texas.

This is intended to be a complete list of properties and districts listed on the National Register of Historic Places in Hunt County, Texas. There are seven properties listed on the National Register in the county. Four of these are also designated Recorded Texas Historic Landmarks.

Current listings

The locations of National Register properties may be seen in a mapping service provided.

|}

Former listings 

|}

See also

National Register of Historic Places listings in Texas
Recorded Texas Historic Landmarks in Hunt County

References

External links

Hunt County, Texas
Hunt County
Buildings and structures in Hunt County, Texas